Cliff Parker is the name of:

 Cliff Parker (footballer) (1913–1983), English football player
 Clifford Gerard Parker (1936–2012), American Cherokee tribal leader